Isabelle Lucy Allen (born 16 March 2002)  is an English stage and screen actress known for her role as the young Cosette in the 2012 film adaptation of Les Misérables. The role earned her critical acclaim and various film cast awards such as the National Board of Review Award for Best Cast and the Satellite Award for Best Cast – Motion Picture.

Career
Allen was discovered by Jeremy James Taylor, head of the British National Youth Music Theatre after seeing her in the play The Pied Piper in Eastbourne, East Sussex, her hometown. She made her professional debut in the 2012 film Les Misérables as the younger version of Amanda Seyfried's character Cosette, which earned her the Young Artist Award for Best Supporting Young Actress Age Ten and Under. She was later cast in the same role in the West End stage production of the show.  She continued in the show until March 2013, sharing her role with: Lois Ellington, Ashley Goldberg and Sarah Huttlestone. From July to September 2013, Allen played Brigitta Von Trapp in The Sound of Music, sharing her role with Imogen Gurney and Ava Merson O'Brien. She has also appeared in Hetty Feather, a CBBC drama.

Personal life
Her parents are Elaine and Nigel Allen.

Filmography

Film

Television

References

External links

2002 births
Living people
21st-century English actresses
English child actresses
English film actresses
Actresses from Wiltshire